Aqua: The Video Collection is a video album/documentary film by the Danish-Norwegian dance-pop group, Aqua, released in 2000. It includes all of the band's videos from the period 1996–2000 and most of the videos made for the singles from their first two studio albums.

Track listing
 "Roses Are Red"
 "Barbie Girl"
 "Doctor Jones"
 "Lollipop"
 "My Oh My"
 "Turn Back Time"
 "Good Morning Sunshine"
 "Cartoon Heroes"
 "Around the World"
 "Bumble Bees"
 Behind the Scenes
 Karaoke
 Photo gallery

Personnel
Lene Nystrom Rasted – female vocals
Rene Dif – male vocals
Søren Rasted – keyboard, guitar
Claus Norreen – keyboard

External links
Official website

Aqua (band) video albums
Documentary films about pop music and musicians
2000 video albums
Music video compilation albums
2000 compilation albums